Francesco Maria Santinelli (1627-1697) was an Italian marquis, count, Marinist poet, librettist, freemason and  alchemist. In Senigallia, Christina, Queen of Sweden was welcomed in verse by the handsome Santinelli and his brother, Ludovico, an acrobat and dancer. Both seem to have been accomplished scoundrels. A year later Ludovico was witness and participant at the murder of Gian Rinaldo Monaldeschi at Fontainebleau. (Francesco Maria was on business in Rome during this infamous event.) After the scandal, she promised Pierre Chanut that Ludivico and his two helpers would have to leave her court.

Works
 Le Donne Gverriere Del Signore Conte Francesco Maria Santinelli. Dedicate All' Eminentissimo Principe Il Signore Cardinale. Rocci, 1647
 Canzoni del conte Francesco Maria Santinelli: Dedicate alla sacra real maestà di Cristina regina gloriosissima di Svetia, 1655
 Prose 1659
 In 1659, Santinelli wrote a poem, Carlo V, dedicated to emperor Leopold I of the Holy Roman Empire in Vienna. 
 In 1666, Santinelli wrote an alchemical poem with commentary, Lux obnubilata suapte natura refulgens, (Light shining forth by its own nature out of darkness) while using the pseudonym Fra Marc’Antonio Crasselame Chinese.
 L'Armida, nemica, amante, e sposa: Dramma musicale (1669)
 Delle poesie del marchese Francesco Maria Santinelli ...: Prima parte. Consacrata alla sacra cesarea maesta' della imperatrice Leonora (1669)
 Delle ode del marchese Santinelli conte della Metola, e marchese di San Sebastiano, &c. cameriero delle chiaue d'oro di sua maestà cesarea: prima parte (1671)
 L'Alessandro overo il trionfo di se stesso: Opera regia (1673)
 Alchimista della Massa Trabaria
 Il catechismo ermetico-massonico della “Stella fiammeggiante”
 Poesie 1680
 Ode 1680

References

External links 
 

1627 births
1697 deaths
Counts of Italy
Italian poets
Italian male poets
Italian librettists
Baroque writers